Rahim Yar Khan railway station (Urdu and ) is located in Rahim Yar Khan city, Rahim Yar Khan district of Punjab province, Pakistan. It is a major railway station of Pakistan Railways on Karachi-Peshawar Railway Line. The station is staffed and has advance and current reservation offices. Food stalls are also located on its platforms.

Train routes
Rahim Yar Khan is linked to Karachi, Lahore, Rawalpindi, Peshawar, Quetta, Multan, Faisalabad, Sargodha, Sialkot, Gujranwala, Hyderabad, Sukkur, Jhang, Bahawalpur, Nawabshah, Attock, Sibi, Khanewal, Gujrat, Rohri, Jacobabad, and Nowshera.

Train services from Rahim Yar Khan

See also
 List of railway stations in Pakistan
 Pakistan Railways

References

External links

Railway stations in Rahim Yar Khan District
Railway stations on Karachi–Peshawar Line (ML 1)